A list of notable Uruguayan politicians:

A

Alberto Abdala
Carlos Abdala
Pablo D. Abdala
Washington Abdala
Sergio Abreu
Eduardo Acevedo Álvarez
Eduardo Acevedo Díaz
Eduardo Acevedo Vásquez
Eduardo Acevedo Maturana
Armando Acosta y Lara
Ernesto Agazzi
Tabaré Aguerre
Mario Aguerrondo
Gonzalo Aguirre
Martín Aguirrezabala
Luis Almagro
Álvaro Alonso
Verónica Alonso
Sofía Álvarez Vignoli
Guillermo Álvarez Iriarte
Julián Álvarez
Mario Álvarez (Uruguay)
Fernando Amado
Gerardo Amaral
Gerardo Amarilla
Juan Justo Amaro
Juan José de Amézaga
José Amorín Batlle
Ernesto Amorín Larrañaga
Carlos Anaya
Enrique Antía
Magdalena Antonelli Moreno
Timoteo Aparicio
Domingo Aramburú
Mariano Arana
Germán Araújo
Ricardo Areco
Domingo Arena
Julia Arévalo de Roche
Beatriz Argimón
Marina Arismendi
Rodney Arismendi
Enrique de Arrascaeta
Roque Arregui
Ledo Arroyo Torres
Pantaleón Astiazarán
Danilo Astori
Alejandro Atchugarry
Patricia Ayala
Juan Eduardo Azzini

B

Alfredo Baldomir
Carlos Baráibar
Julio Baraibar
Miguel Barreiro
Javier Barrios Amorín
Luis Barrios Tassano
Artigas Barrios
Pilar Barrios
Hugo Batalla
César Batlle Pacheco
Jorge Batlle
José Batlle y Ordóñez
Lorenzo Batlle
Lorenzo Batlle Pacheco
Luis Batlle Berres
Rafael Batlle Pacheco
Francisco Bauzá
Rufino Bauzá
José Bayardi
Washington Beltrán Barbat
Enrique Beltrán Mullin
Washington Beltrán Mullin
Walter Belvisi
Alberto Bensión
Bertil Bentos
Ramón V. Benzano
Mario Bergara
Ricardo Bernal
Tomás Berreta
Bernardo Prudencio Berro
Pedro Berro
Azucena Berrutti
Andrés Berterreche
Guillermo Besozzi
Daniel Bianchi
Jerónimo Pío Bianqui
Daniel Blanco Acevedo
Eduardo Blanco Acevedo
Juan Carlos Blanco Acevedo
Pablo Blanco Acevedo
Juan Carlos Blanco Estradé
Juan Carlos Blanco Fernández
Juan Benito Blanco
Néstor Bolentini
Eduardo Bonomi
Domingo Bordaberry
Juan María Bordaberry
Pedro Bordaberry
Gustavo Borsari
Sergio Botana
Eduardo Bottinelli
Enrique Braga
Luis Alberto Brause
Miguel Brechner Frey
Tomás Brena
Eduardo Brenta
Luis Brezzo
Ángel Brian
Mariano Brito
Jorge Brovetto
Alfeo Brum
Baltasar Brum
Jorge Bruni
Domingo Burgueño Miguel
Horacio Buscaglia

C

Carmelo Cabrera (militar)
Lucio Cáceres
Walter Campanella
Juan Campisteguy
Diego Cánepa
Mario Cantón
Marcos Carámbula
Álvaro Carbone
Felipe Santiago Cardoso
Germán Cardoso
José Carlos Cardoso
José Pedro Cardoso
Julio Cardozo Ferreira
Mario Carminatti
Lorenzo Carnelli
Justino Carrere Sapriza
Pedro Casaballe
Federico Casaretto
Armando Castaingdebat
Ney Castillo
Nora Castro
Raúl Casás
Carlos Cat
Washington Cataldi
Jorge Caumont
Luis Caviglia
Gustavo Cersósimo
Pedro Cersósimo
Jorge Chapper
César Charlone
Juan Vicente Chiarino
Sergio Chiesa
Guillermo Chifflet
Juan Antonio Chiruchi
Alberto Cid
Humberto Ciganda
Carlos Colacce
Ariel Collazo
Teófilo Collazo
Roberto Conde
Hugo Cores
Ismael Cortinas
Alberto Couriel
Germán Coutinho
Wilson Craviotto
Juan José Crottogini

D

José D'Elía
Eber da Rosa Vázquez
Eber da Rosa Viñoles
Susana Dalmás
José Pedro Damiani
Ariel Davrieux
Óscar de los Santos
Isidoro de María
Elisa Delle Piane
Carlos Delpiazzo
Mariella Demarco
Alberto Demicheli
Christian Di Candia
José Enrique Díaz Chávez
Daniel Díaz Maynard
Antonio F. Díaz
Juan José Durán

E

Martín Echegoyen
Walter Echeverría
Ricardo Ehrlich
José Eugenio Ellauri
José Longinos Ellauri
Wilson Elso Goñi
Carlos Enciso
Enrique Erro
José Espalter
Rudyard Esquivo
Sandra Etcheverry
Wilson Ezquerra Martinotti

F

Juan Pedro Fabini
Ángel Fachinetti
Yamandú Fau
Hugo Fernández Artucio
Daniel Fernández Crespo
Hugo Fernández Faingold
Eleuterio Fernández Huidobro
Eduardo Fernández Farías
Elbio Fernández
Gonzalo Fernández
Lorenzo Antonio Fernández
Wilson Ferreira Aldunate
Juan Raúl Ferreira Sienra
Felipe Ferreiro
Salvador Ferrer Serra
Luis Alberto Ferrizo
Pedro Figari
Carlos Fischer
Manuel Flores Mora
Manuel Flores Silva
Venancio Flores
Ramón Fonticiella
Francisco Forteza
Francisco Forteza (hijo)
Antonio Francese
Emilio Frugoni
Gabriel Frugoni

G

Daniel Gadola
Alberto Gallinal Heber
Alejandro Gallinal
Francisco Gallinal
Gustavo Gallinal
Luis José Gallo
Carlos Gamou
Jorge Gandini
Primavera Garbarino
Federico García Capurro
Guillermo García Costa
Tomás García de Zúñiga
Alfredo García Morales
Daniel García Pintos
Pablo García Pintos
Washington García Rijo
Alem García
Álvaro García (Uruguay)
Javier García Duchini
Francisco García y Santos
Reinaldo Gargano
Juan Manuel Garino
Nora Gauthier
Juan Andrés Gelly
Adolfo Gelsi Bidart
Carlos Gianelli
Luis Giannattasio
Ángel María Gianola
Héctor Giorgi
Tomás Gomensoro
Eugenio Gómez
Rodolfo González Rissotto
Bari González
Rodrigo Goñi
Héctor Grauert
Julio César Grauert
Héctor Gros Espiell
Alberto Guani
Julio Guastavino
Gabriel Gurméndez
Héctor Gutiérrez Ruiz

H

Tabaré Hackenbruch
Eduardo Víctor Haedo
Faustino Harrison
Alberto Héber Usher
Arturo Heber Füllgraff
Luis Alberto Heber
Mario Heber
Nelson Hernández
Julio Herrera y Obes
Manuel Herrera y Obes
Belela Herrera
Juan José de Herrera
Luis Alberto de Herrera
Luis de Herrera
Nicolás Herrera
Luis Hierro
Luis Hierro Gambardella
Luis Hierro López

I
Juan Idiarte Borda
Alberto Iglesias (Uruguay)
Enrique V. Iglesias
Santos Inzaurralde
Dante Iocco
Benjamín Irazábal
Pablo Iturralde
Raúl Iturria

J

Eduardo Jiménez de Aréchaga
Justino Jiménez de Aréchaga
Cándido Juanicó
Jorge Otero Mendoza
Raúl Jude
Raumar Jude
Julio Sánchez Padilla
Jóvenes turcos (Uruguay)

K

Liliam Kechichian
José Korzeniak
Roberto Kreimerman

L

Luis Alberto Lacalle
Luis Alberto Lacalle Pou
Omar Lafluf
Daniel Lamas
Luis Lamas
Aldo Lamorte
Aquiles Lanza
Julio Lara
Dámaso Antonio Larrañaga
Jorge Larrañaga
María Elena Laurnaga
Ariel Lausarot
Francisco Lavandeira
Héctor Leis
Jorge Lepra
Héctor Lescano
Arturo Lezama
Víctor Licandro
Ruperto Long
Oscar López Goldaracena
Héctor Lorenzo y Losada
Álvaro F. Lorenzo
Fernando Lorenzo
Eduardo Lorier
Paulina Luisi
Arturo Lussich

M

Jorge Machiñena
Óscar Magurno
José Carlos Mahía
Eduardo Malaquina
Armando Malet
Luis Eduardo Mallo
Pedro Manini Ríos
Carlos Manini Ríos
Antonio Marchesano
Julio Marenales
Pablo de María
Martin Aguirre Pérez
Rubén Martínez Huelmo
Álvaro Martínez Spinola
Andrés Martínez Trueba
Daniel Martínez
Martín C. Martínez
Daniel Hugo Martins
Andrés Masoller
José Luis Massera
Álvaro Maynard
César Mayo Gutiérrez
Carlos Mazzullo
Benito Medero
Rosario Medero
Carminillo Mederos
Luis Melián Lafinur
Eudoro Melo
Aparicio Méndez
Constante Mendiondo
Antonio Mercader
Felipe Michelini
Rafael Michelini
Zelmar Michelini
Pablo Mieres
Pablo Millor
Eduardo Minutti
Néstor Minutti
Jaime Montaner
Martha Montaner
José Benito Monterroso
Carlos Moreira
Constanza Moreira
Luis Mosca
Jorge Mota
Basilio Muñoz
Francisco Joaquín Muñoz
María Julia Muñoz
Graciela Muslera

N

Atilio Narancio
Benito Nardone
Alfredo Navarro
Rodolfo Nin Novoa
Edgardo Novick

O

Lucas Obes
Daniel Olesker
Fernando Oliú
Ana Olivera
Didier Opertti
Manuel Oribe
Dardo Ortiz
Edgardo Ortuño
Marne Osorio

P

Jorge Pacheco Areco
Jorge Pacheco Klein
Álvaro Pacheco Seré
Melchor Pacheco y Obes
Ricardo Pascale
Ope Pasquet
Ivonne Passada
Daniela Payssé
Eduardo Paz Aguirre
Jorge Peirano Facio
Carlos María Penadés
Gustavo Penadés
Wilfredo Penco
Adriana Peña
Daniel Peña Fernández
Margarita Percovich
Alberto Perdomo
Setembrino Pereda
Ulysses Pereira Reverbel
Gabriel Antonio Pereira
Carlos Julio Pereyra
José Manuel Pérez Castellano
Darío Pérez
Jaime Pérez
Luis Eduardo Pérez
Enrique Pintado
Isabel Pinto de Vidal
Walter Pintos Risso
Julio Pintos
Carlos Pirán
Carlos Pita
Humberto Pittamiglio
Juan E. Pivel Devoto
Ana Lía Piñeyrúa
Ricardo Planchón Geymonat
Ricardo Planchón Malán
Saviniano 'Nano' Pérez
Eduardo Pons Echeverry
Iván Posada
Gervasio de Posadas Belgrano
Ignacio de Posadas
Juan Martín Posadas
Julia Pou
Luis Bernardo Pozzolo
Ricardo Prato
Sergio Previtali
Alfredo Puig Spangenberg
Carlos V. Puig
Adauto Puñales
Yeanneth Puñales

Q

Carlos Quijano

R

Oscar Víctor Rachetti
Juan Carlos Raffo Frávega
Juan Carlos Raffo Costemalle
Carlos María Ramírez
Gonzalo Ramírez
José Pedro Ramírez
Juan Andrés Ramírez
Álvaro Ramos Trigo
Ángel Rath
Walter Ravenna
Dardo Regules
Elías Regules
Ricardo Reilly Salaverry
Alfonso Requiterena
Adela Reta
Hamlet Reyes
Ariel Riani
Irineu Riet Correa
Héctor Lorenzo Ríos
Silvio Ríos
Fructuoso Rivera
Alba Roballo
José Enrique Rodó
Francisco Rodríguez Camusso
Manuel Rodríguez Correa
Carlos Rodríguez Labruna
Eduardo Rodríguez Larreta
Matilde Rodríguez Larreta
José Luis Rodríguez Reys
Edgardo Rodríguez
Raúl Rodríguez da Silva
Renán Rodríguez
Rubén Rodríguez López
Glenda Rondán
José Rondeau
Luis Rosadilla
Mauricio Rosencof
Rómulo Rossi
Mario Rossi Garretano
Víctor Rossi
Carlos Roxlo
Antonio Rubio Pérez
Eduardo Rubio
Enrique Rubio (Uruguay)

S

Sebatián Sabini
Dardo Sánchez Cal
Florencio Sánchez
Jorge Sanguinetti
Julio María Sanguinetti
Bertha Sanseverino
Walter Santoro
Jorge Sapelli
Max Sapolinsky
Miguel Saralegui
Aparicio Saravia
Basilicio Saravia
Diana Saravia Olmos
Jorge Saravia
Villanueva Saravia
Helios Sarthou
Alberto Scavarelli
Oscar Secco Ellauri
Joaquín Secco Illa
Glauco Segovia
Víctor Semproni
Raúl Fernando Sendic
Raúl Sendic
Líber Seregni
José Serrato
Carlos Signorelli
Jorge Silveira Zabala
Julio Silveira
Melitón Simois
María Simón
Juan Adolfo Singer
Federico Slinger
Alfredo Solari
Mariano Soler
Julio María Sosa
Benito Stern
Guillermo Stirling
Nicolás Storace Arrosa
Juan Luis Storace
Nicolás Storace Montes
Héctor Martín Sturla
Víctor Sudriers

T

Héctor Tajam
Enrique Tarigo
Duvimioso Terra
Gabriel Terra
Horacio Terra Arocena
Juan Pablo Terra
Oscar Terzaghi
Miguel Toma
Lucía Topolansky
Daisy Tourné
Uruguay Tourné
Mónica Travieso
Vivian Trías
Jaime Trobo
Luis Tróccoli

U

Francisco Mario Ubillos
Raúl Ugarte
Daoiz Uriarte

V

Víctor Vaillant
Carlos Varela (Uruguay)
Carlos Varela Rodríguez
Jacobo Adrián Varela
José Pedro Varela
Pedro Varela
Amílcar Vasconcellos
Alfredo Vásquez Acevedo
Alembert Vaz
Pedro Vaz
Jorge Vázquez Rosas
Santiago Vázquez
Tabaré Vázquez
Carlos Végh Garzón
Alejandro Végh Villegas
Walter Verri
Javier de Viana
Carmelo Vidalín
Federico Vidiella
Feliciano Viera
Leonel Viera
Tabaré Viera
Ana María Vignoli
Carlos Jerónimo Villademoros
Hugo Villar
José Villar
José Villar Gómez
Alberto Volonté

W

Claudio Williman
José Claudio Wílliman

X

Mónica Xavier

Z

Pedro Zabalza Arrospide
Jorge Zabalza
Justino Zavala Muniz
Ricardo Zerbino
Walter Zimmer
Alejandro Zorrilla de San Martín
Juan Zorrilla de San Martín
Alberto Fermín Zubiría
Jaime de Zudáñez
Alberto Zumarán

 
Politician
Uruguay